Tereanini was one of the great ocean-going, voyaging canoes that was used in the migrations that settled New Zealand in Māori tradition.

Ngāti Porou traces its heritage back to Tereanini and a number of other waka.

According to oral history, it was captained by Rongomaituaho, who had followed his father Paikea (a key ancestor of Ngāti Porou) from Hawaiki.

See also
List of Māori waka

References

Māori waka